Laurentius Nicolaas Deckers (14 February 1883 – 1 January 1978) was a Dutch politician and diplomat of the defunct Roman Catholic State Party (RKSP) and later co-founder of the Catholic People's Party (KVP) now merged into the Christian Democratic Appeal (CDA) party and agronomist.

Political career
Deckers was elected as a Member of the House of Representatives after the election of 1918, taking office on 17 September 1918. After the election of 1929 Deckers was appointed as Minister of Defence in the Cabinet Ruijs de Beerenbrouck III, taking office on 10 August 1929. After the election of 1933 Deckers returned as a Member of the House of Representatives, taking office on 9 May 1933. Following the cabinet formation of 1933 Deckers continued as Minister of Defence in the Cabinet Colijn II, taking office on 26 May 1933. The Cabinet Colijn II fell on 23 July 1935 and continued to serve in a demissionary capacity until the cabinet formation of 1935 when it was replaced by Cabinet Colijn III with Deckers remaining as Minister of Defence, taking office on 31 July 1935. Deckers was appointed as Minister of Agriculture and Fisheries after the Ministry of Economic Affairs was split into the Ministry of Commerce, Industry and Shipping and the Ministry of Agriculture and Fisheries, taking office on 2 September 1935. After the election of 1937 Deckers again returned as a Member of the House of Representatives, taking office on 8 June 1937. Following the cabinet formation of 1937 Deckers was not giving a cabinet post in the new cabinet, the Cabinet Colijn III was replaced by the Cabinet Colijn IV on 24 June 1937 and he continued to serve in the House of Representatives as a frontbencher. Deckers was selected as Parliamentary leader of the Roman Catholic State Party in the House of Representatives following the election of Josef van Schaik as a Speaker of the House of Representatives and was also selected as Leader of the Roman Catholic State Party following the retirement of Piet Aalberse Sr., taking office on 11 November 1937.

On 10 May 1940 Nazi Germany invaded the Netherlands and the government fled to London to escape the German occupation. During World War II Deckers continued to serve as a Member of the House of Representatives but in reality the De facto political influence of the House of Representatives was marginalized. On 9 October 1940 Deckers was arrested and detained in Buchenwald concentration camp and was released on 7 November 1940. Deckers also served retroactively as Chairman of the Roman Catholic State Party from 1 September 1941 after Timotheus Verschuur was detained in Sachsenhausen concentration camp and later died in captivity on 17 April 1945. In May 1942 Deckers was arrested and detained again in Buchenwald concentration camp and was released in August 1942. Following the end of World War II Queen Wilhelmina ordered a Recall of Parliament and Deckers remained a Member of the House of Representatives, taking office on 20 November 1945. On 22 December 1945 the Roman Catholic State Party was renamed as the Catholic People's Party, Deckers was one of the co-founders and became one of the unofficial Deputy Leader of the Catholic People's Party and was selected as the first Parliamentary leader of the Catholic People's Party in the House of Representatives.

In March 1946 Deckers was nominated as Member of the Council of State, he resigned as Parliamentary leader and a Member of the House of Representatives the day he was installed as a Member of the Council of State, serving from 1 April 1946 until 1 March 1958.

Decorations

References

External links

Official
  Mr.Dr. L.N. Deckers Parlement & Politiek

|-

1883 births
1978 deaths
Buchenwald concentration camp survivors
Catholic People's Party politicians
Chairmen of the Catholic People's Party
Commanders of the Order of the Netherlands Lion
Dutch agronomists
Dutch corporate directors
Dutch expatriates in Belgium
Dutch nonprofit directors
Dutch nonprofit executives
Dutch people of World War II
Dutch political party founders
Dutch prisoners of war in World War II
Dutch Roman Catholics
Dutch trade association executives
General League of Roman Catholic Caucuses politicians
Grand Officers of the Order of Orange-Nassau
Grand Officers of the Order of the Crown (Belgium)
Grand Officiers of the Légion d'honneur
KU Leuven alumni
Knights Grand Cross of the Order of St Gregory the Great
Knights of Malta
Knights of the Holy Sepulchre
Recipients of the Order pro Merito Melitensi
Leaders of political parties in the Netherlands
Leiden University alumni
Ministers of Agriculture of the Netherlands
Ministers of the Navy of the Netherlands
Ministers of War of the Netherlands
Members of the Council of State (Netherlands)
Members of the House of Representatives (Netherlands)
Party chairs of the Netherlands
People from Eindhoven
People from Heeze-Leende
Politicians from The Hague
Roman Catholic State Party politicians
Academic staff of Tilburg University
World War II civilian prisoners
World War II prisoners of war held by Germany
20th-century Dutch businesspeople
20th-century Dutch civil servants
20th-century Dutch diplomats
20th-century Dutch educators
20th-century Dutch jurists
20th-century Dutch politicians